Love Can Do That is an album by Elaine Paige, released in 1991. It was Paige's first album released by RCA and marketed in Europe by BMG. Produced by Dennis Lambert and recorded at The Zoo in Encino, California. The album reached #36 in the UK album chart.

The album was the nearest Paige's recordings came to contemporary pop, featuring a number of ballads that were previously recorded by artists such as Barbra Streisand's "Heart Don't Change My Mind" and Cyndi Lauper's "True Colors". The songs also included "Same Train", a duet with Christopher Cross, and "Only The Very Best", from the concept musical Tycoon for which Tim Rice wrote an English lyric. The song was originally performed in French in the musical Starmania.

Track listing

 "Love Can Do That" (Diane Warren)
 "Oxygen" (Nik Kershaw)
 "Heart Don't Change My Mind" (Diane Warren/Robbie Buchanan)
 "Same Train” (featuring Christopher Cross) (Dyna Brein/Cal Curtis/Chris Farren)
 "You Don't Own Me" (John Madara/David White)
 "I Only Have Eyes for You" (Al Dubin/Harry Warren)
 "Well Almost" (Mike Chapman/Holly Knight)
 "True Colours" (Tom Kelly/Billy Steinberg)
 "If I Love You" (Toni Jolene/Jim Weatherly)
 "He's Out Of My Life" (Tom Bahler)
 "Only The Very Best" (Michel Berger/Luc Plamondon/Tim Rice) - from the musical Starmania
 "Grow Young" (Jimmy Webb)

Personnel

Musicians 
Elaine Paige - vocals
Christopher Cross - vocals (on “Same Train”)
Claude Gaudette - keyboards, bass, drums and percussion
Michael Thompson - guitar
Dennis Lambert - percussion, backing vocals
Katrina Perkins - backing vocals
Jean McClain - backing vocals
Darryl Phinesse - backing vocals
David Lawrence - keyboards, bass, drums, percussion, backing vocals
Robbie Buchanan - keyboards, bass, drums, percussion
Paul Jackson Jr. - guitars
Michael Baird - drums
David Boroff - saxophone
Rickey Grundy Chorale - backing vocals
Gerald Vince - strings
Bob Sanov - strings
Ray Tisher - strings
Fred Seykora - strings

Production
Producer - Dennis Lambert
Production co-ordinator - Marrianne L. Pellicci
Assistant engineers - Lawrence Fried, Elaine Anderson, Sally Browder and Pat MacDougal
Arranger and programmer - Claude Gaudette, Robbie Buchanan and David Lawrence
Basic track, vocals and guitar recording - Jeremy Smith, Doug Rider and Gabe Veltri
Mixer - Brian Malouf, Jeremy Smith, Doug Rider and Gabe Veltri
Strings Contractor - Joe Saldo
Mixing Studios - The Zoo, Smoketree, O'Henry and Can Am Studios

References

1991 albums
Elaine Paige albums